Mohammed Dangor is a South African politician, diplomat and anti-apartheid activist who has been a Permanent Delegate to the National Council of Provinces since June 2019. He is a member of the Gauteng provincial delegation representing the African National Congress. Dangor had previously served as South Africa's ambassador to Libya, Syria, and Saudi Arabia.

Background
One of nine children, Dangor became involved in the struggle against apartheid at a young age. After the end of apartheid, Dangor became South Africa's ambassador to  Libya, Syria, and Saudi Arabia.

Parliamentary career
Following the 2019 general election, Dangor was elected as a permanent delegate to the National Council of Provinces from the Gauteng province, representing the African National Congress. He was the only delegate not sworn in along with all the other permanent delegates during the first sitting of the NCOP on 23 May 2019; he was sworn in on 9 June 2019 at Constitutional Hill in Johannesburg by Judge President Dustan Mlambo of the Gauteng Division of the High Court.

Committee assignments
Joint Constitutional Review Committee
Select Committee on Cooperative Governance and Traditional Affairs, Water and Sanitation and Human Settlements
Select Committee on Land Reform, Environment, Mineral Resources and Energy
Select Committee on Petitions and Executive Undertakings
Select Committee on Public Enterprises and Communication (Alternate Member)
Select Committee on Security and Justice
Select Committee on Transport, Public Service and Administration, Public Works and Infrastructure
Select Committee on Trade and Industry, Economic Development, Small Business Development, Tourism, Employment and Labour

Personal life
Dangor is a brother of the late ANC deputy secretary-general and anti-apartheid activist Jessie Duarte.

In March 2019, Dangor and his wife were admitted to ICU after they were brutally attacked during a robbery at their home in Johannesburg, Gauteng.

References

External links

Profile at Parliament of South Africa

Living people
Year of birth missing (living people)
People from Gauteng
African National Congress politicians
Members of the National Council of Provinces
Anti-apartheid activists